Chaulet is a French surname. Notable people with the surname include:

Emmanuelle Chaulet (born 1962), French actress
Georges Chaulet (1931–2012), French writer
Pierre Chaulet (1930–2012), doctor who worked with the FLN during the Algerian War

French-language surnames